72nd ACE Eddie Awards
March 5, 2022

Feature Film (Dramatic): 
King Richard

Feature Film (Comedy): 
tick, tick... BOOM!

The 72nd American Cinema Editors Eddie Awards were presented on March 5, 2022, at the Ace Hotel in Downtown Los Angeles, honoring the best editors in films and television of 2021. The nominees were announced on January 27, 2022. Debbie Allen and Richard Chew both received the Career Achievement Award.

Winners and nominees

Film

Television

References

External links
 

72
2021 film awards
2021 in American cinema